The  mile was a track cycling event held as part of the Cycling at the 1904 Summer Olympics programme.  It was the only time this  event was held at the Olympics.  11 American cyclists competed.

Results

Heats

The top two finishers in each heat advanced to the semifinals.

Semifinals

The top two finishers in each semifinal advanced to the final.

Final

References

Sources

 

Cycling at the 1904 Summer Olympics
Track cycling at the 1904 Summer Olympics
Olympic track cycling events